Jozef Škandík (born 13 July 1963 in Bojnice) is a Slovak former handball player who competed in the 1988 Summer Olympics.

References

1963 births
Living people
Slovak male handball players
Olympic handball players of Czechoslovakia
Handball players at the 1988 Summer Olympics
Czechoslovak male handball players
Sportspeople from Bojnice